The 1969 New Zealand general election was a nationwide vote to determine the shape of Parliament's 36th term. It saw the Second National Government headed by Prime Minister Keith Holyoake of the National Party win a fourth consecutive term. This is the most recent election where an incumbent government won a fourth term in office.

1967 electoral redistribution
Through an amendment in the Electoral Act in 1965, the number of electorates in the South Island was fixed at 25, an increase of one since the 1962 electoral redistribution. It was accepted that through the more rapid population growth in the North Island, the number of its electorates would continue to increase, and to keep proportionality, three new electorates were allowed for in the 1967 electoral redistribution for the next election. In the North Island, five electorates were newly created (and ) and one electorate was reconstituted while three electorates were abolished (and ). In the South Island, three electorates were newly created (and ) and one electorate was reconstituted while three electorates were abolished (and ). The overall effect of the required changes was highly disruptive to existing electorates, with all but three electorates (and ) having their boundaries altered. These changes came into effect with the 1969 election.

The increase to 84 electorates was the first since the 1902 electoral distribution.

MPs retiring in 1969
Four National MPs and five Labour MPs intended to retire at the end of the 35th Parliament.

Sir Walter Nash MP for Hutt had announced he would retire at the end of the term in 1969, but he died on 4 June 1968 triggering a by-election instead.

Election
The election was held on 29 November. Turnout was 88.94%. The total number of MPs had increased to 84, with at least 3 of the 4 new seats likely Labour seats. 55 and 25 electorates were in the North Island and South Island, respectively, plus the 4 Māori electorates.

Results
National pulled off a cliff-hanger victory. National won 45 seats, and Labour won 39 seats, though Labour's share of the vote was only 1% behind National. The Social Credit Party lost its only seat in Parliament: Hobson, formerly held by then party leader Vernon Cracknell.

Despite the hopes of a reinvigorated Labour party under Norman Kirk, Labour was overconfident, started too late, and did not win in Auckland. Relations with the Federation of Labour and the unions were not good, and an industrial dispute on the ship Wainui cost Labour three Auckland seats according to Kirk. Labour MP Warren Freer personally believed that "had it not been for the seamen's strike during the election period, we could have won".

In , Labour was first on election night but lost when special votes were counted.

Votes summary

The table below shows the results of the 1969 general election:

Key

|-
 |colspan=8 style="background-color:#FFDEAD" | General electorates
|-

|-
 | Hauraki
 | style="background-color:;" |
 | style="text-align:center;" | Arthur Kinsella
 | style="background-color:;" |
 | style="text-align:center;background-color:;" | Leo Schultz
 | style="text-align:right;" | 2,121
 | style="background-color:;" |
 | style="text-align:center;" | Dorothy Jelicich
|-

|-
 |colspan=8 style="background-color:#FFDEAD" | Māori electorates
|-

|}
Table footnotes:

Notes

References

 
November 1969 events in New Zealand